Aisha Ahmad Suleiman born (17 December 2001) is a Northern Nigerian female polo player, photographer, and entrepreneur. She is from Kogi state. She was born and brought up in Kaduna state, Nigeria. Aisha is one of the very few black female polo players in the world and the only female polo player from the Northern Nigeria at the moment. She plays for the Kaduna Polo Club.

Early life and background
Aisha Ahmad Suleiman is an native of Adavi local government area of Kogi State, she was born  and raised in Kaduna North, Kaduna State, Nigeria. She is a daughter to Ahmad Suleiman and Hauwa Bello. Aisha Ahmad Suleiman attended nursery, primary and secondary schools in Kaduna.

Career
The first encounter Suleiman had with horse was when she attended a polo match with friends. Aisha Ahmad Suleiman got in touch with a man named Husseini Muhammed who happened to be the coach and trainers of polo beginners in Kaduna. Husseini gave her first mallet to play with. Aisha played her first tournament on the 17th of December 2017 in Kaduna.

Awards and trophies
 Winner of Dantata and Sawoe Cup, Kano International Tournament 2018
 Winner Of The Governor's Cup, Port Harcourt International Tournament 2019.
 Winner Of The Governor's Cup, Kano  International Tournament 2019.
 Sport Woman Year 2020, Northern Pandora Awards
 Nominee of The African Horse Weeke 2020

References

External links

The black, female polo player changing perceptions in 'sport of kings'
Nigeria's Aisha Suleman breaking barriers for women in Polo

Nigerian polo players
2001 births
Living people
People from Kaduna State